Heaton Park Hebrew Congregation is a large Ashkenazi Orthodox synagogue located in North Manchester, United Kingdom. It was founded in 1935, and in 2010 had between 500 and 749 members. Under the aegis of the Chief Rabbi of the United Kingdom, Reverend Leslie Olsberg MBE led the congregation for 35 years until his death in 2008. Rabbi Daniel Walker succeeded him, and currently heads the congregation. Yehuda Marx is the hazzan.

History
The Heaton Park Hebrew Congregation was formally founded in 1935. By 1999, it had a membership of 550. Reverend Leslie Olsberg retired from his position in 2008, aged 86, after 35 years' service.
The congregation is housed in a 1967 red brick postwar building on Middleton Road, Crumpsall. Architectural historian Carol Herselle Krinsky describes it, unadmiringly, as having a "central block with projecting wings" and "a disproportionately large glass entrance wall." According to architectural historian Sharman Kadish, the building is one of three Manchester area synagogues modelled on the 1934 building of Manchester's Holy Law Synagogue with its tripartite facade in a "pleasing international style."  The other two are the Manchester Reform Synagogue Jackson's Row, and the Prestwich Hebrew Congregation.

On 22 April 2000 and again on 15 September 2002 antisemitic remarks were shouted at the synagogue. Synagogue security cameras captured a murder on film in 2008, when violinist Michael Kahan was stabbed to death outside a Kosher bakery near the synagogue building by a mentally ill assailant.

References

External links
Link to image
Jewish Gen page

Ashkenazi Jewish culture in England
Synagogues in Manchester
Orthodox synagogues in England
Religious buildings and structures in Greater Manchester
Jewish organizations established in 1935
1935 establishments in England
Synagogues completed in 1967
1967 establishments in England